Middlebriars Wood is a   nature reserve in Hurtmore, west of  Farncombe in Surrey. It is managed by the Surrey Wildlife Trust.

This is a small mixed wood in a residential area of Hurtmore. The trust is working to improve its ecological value.

There is access from Priorsfield Road.

References

Surrey Wildlife Trust